Enrique Fernández López (born 16 September 2003), sometimes known as Quique, is a Spanish professional footballer who plays as a midfielder for Betis Deportivo Balompié.

Professional career
Fernández is a youth product of Trebujena CF and Cádiz CF, before joining the youth academy of Real Betis in 2015. He worked his way up their youth categories, before captaining their U19s and promoting to their reserve team in 2021. On 25 August 2022, he signed his first professional contract with Real Betis until 2024. He made his senior and professional debut with Real Betis as a late substitute in a 1–0 UEFA Europa League win over Ludogorets on 27 October 2022.

International career
Fernández is a youth international for Spain, having played up to the Spain U16s.

Playing style
Fernández is a physical midfielder with great passing technique. He is adept at occupying space, and moves well with and without the ball. He is a great playmaker, a great ball holder and very rarely loses possession.

References

External links
 
 
 

2003 births
Living people
Sportspeople from the Province of Cádiz
Spanish footballers
Spain youth international footballers
Association football midfielders
Real Betis players
Betis Deportivo Balompié footballers
Segunda Federación players